Kim Min-ho (born 28 December 1991) is a South Korean former professional footballer.

Career

Brought to Singapore S.League team Balestier Khalsa on the recommendations of teammate Park Kang-jin, Kim lived with him through his stay there. However, he found it difficult to adapt as he was unable to communicate with anybody but his club was able to fund English lessons for him.

Even though he scored in the 2014 Singapore Cup final and the 2013 Singapore League Cup, Kim was released, going back to his homeland to take up a job in screen baseball instead.

Made the Goal.com S.League Team of the Week for Round 13 in 2013 with a goal in a 2–2 tie with Geylang International.

Personal life

Kim was born in South Korea. He had not learned English in school, and was reticent when having to speak it in Singapore.

References

South Korean footballers
South Korean expatriate footballers
South Korean expatriate sportspeople in Singapore
Living people
Association football forwards
Balestier Khalsa FC players
Singapore Premier League players
Expatriate footballers in Singapore
1991 births